TJC may refer to:

Tennessee Justice Center, a non-profit advocacy organization and a law firm
The Jewish Channel, a cable television channel
The Joint Commission, a non-profit tax exempt organization in Illinois, United States
Tibet Justice Center, an American legal association 
Transitional Justice Commission, an independent government agency of Taiwan
True Jesus Church, the largest Oneness Pentecostal church in China

Educational institutions
Temasek Junior College, a co-educational junior college in Singapore
Tokyo Jogakkan College, a private women's college in Tokyo, Japan
Tyler Junior College, a public community college in Texas, United States

Businesses
Tokuma Japan Communications, a publishing company
The Jewellery Channel, a TV shopping channel in the United Kingdom